Voice from the Grave, also known as From the Files of Unsolved Mysteries: Voice from the Grave and Crimes of Passion: Voice from the Grave, is a 1996 television film based on a real-life case from the Unsolved Mysteries television series. The film was written by Bill Phillips and directed by David Jackson.

Premise
A segment from the Unsolved Mysteries TV series, the February 1977 murder of 47-year-old respiratory therapist Teresita Basa in Chicago, Illinois, inspired this story, in which a nurse (Megan Ward) claims that she is possessed by a murdered co-worker's spirit which identifies the killer.

Cast
Kevin Dobson as Detective Joe Stachula
Megan Ward as Renee Perkins
John Terlesky as Bill Perkins
Michael Riley as Adam Schuster
Kim Dickens as Terry Deveroux
Robert Knepper as Milosh
Kelli Williams as Yvonne Shuster
John Carroll Lynch as Prosecutor O'Gane
Michael Mantell as Attorney Smith
Eric Menyuk as Nate Bradshaw

Releases
The television film originally aired on NBC on April 22, 1996, and was later released on Region 2 DVD.

References

1996 television films
1996 films
1996 crime drama films
American crime drama films
American television films
1990s English-language films
Crime films based on actual events
Films directed by David Jackson (director)
1990s American films